The Swap may refer to:
 The Swap (1979 film)
 The Swap (2016 film)
 The Swap (TV series)